The UNCAF Women's Interclub Championship is Central America's women's club football championship organized by UNCAF.

Results

Performance by club

Performance by country

References

External links
Fútbol Femenino – Torneo Interclubes, UNCAFut.com
Official Facebook page

 
Women's association football competitions in North America
Women's Club Championship
Recurring sporting events established in 2016